The sport of football in the country of Jordan is run by the Jordan Football Association. The association administers the national football team as well as the Jordan League. Football is the most popular sport in the country.

History 
Football in Jordan was introduced during the time of the Ottoman Empire, when Jordan/Transjordan was part of that empire. Similar to many countries in the world, Jordan (as part of Ottoman Empire) enjoyed their first football development brought by British sailors and merchants; however under autocratic rule of Abdul Hamid II, football was forbidden and it was not until 1908 that football became popular.

Following the British occupation after the World War I, football, which was introduced by the British, increased its popularity in Transjordan, and the Jordanian Pro League was founded at 1944. The Jordanian national football team's first international match was played in 1953 in Egypt where the team defeated Syria 3–1. The first FIFA World Cup qualifiers Jordan took part in was the 1986 qualifiers. The first (Jordanian) football coach, Mohammad Awad (father of Adnan Awad), to attain achievements for the Jordan national team between 1992 and 1999, when he first helped his country Jordan win the Jordan International tournament of 1992 and both tournaments of the Pan Arab Games, starting in 1997 in Beirut, and 1999 in Amman. However, for most of the 20th century, Jordan didn't achieve significant result and had been largely considered one of Asia and Arab World's weaker side, largely owned by historical ethnic tensions and sectarianism between native Jordanians and Palestinians.

National team

The national football team of Jordan play home games at the 17,619-capacity Amman International Stadium and the 13,265-capacity King Abdullah II Stadium. At the 21st century, Jordan began to emerge and improve, obtain significant result under Branko Smiljanić and gained recognition by qualified to 2004 AFC Asian Cup, where Jordan created two shocking draws over 2002 FIFA World Cup hosts South Korea and Japan, eventually stopped at the quarter-finals by eventual champions Japan. Jordan kept shocking Asia in the 2011 edition which Jordan once again, drew Japan and beating Saudi Arabia, before losing to Uzbekistan at the quarter-finals. The trend of success followed, for the first time in their history, Jordan have qualified for the final round of the FIFA World Cup qualifiers in the 2014 World Cup qualification campaign, reaching playoff but bowed down to a formidable Uruguay 0–5 after two legs and missed its World Cup debut. After that, the team's performance stagnated, with Jordan crashed out from the group stage for the first time in 2015 AFC Asian Cup, losing to Iraq and Japan. In 2018 World Cup qualification, Jordan also failed to repeat the feat of 2014 qualification.

Jordan has a chance to restore the team's priority in the 2019 AFC Asian Cup, when Jordan created a stunning group stage performance, beating then-Asian champions Australia 1–0 and Syria 2–0, to top the group stage with nearly perfect seven points. In their third knockout stage participation against Vietnam, which was regarded as the weakest ever opponent for Jordan in the knockout round of an Asian Cup, Jordan however had been shockingly eliminated after losing on penalty shootout 2–4, which was regarded with shocks across Asia.

References